The Burla (Borly) is a river in Russia and Kazakhstan.

The Burla river system is an endorheic watershed. In the Russian Federation the basin of the river is located mainly in Altai Krai, with a little section in Novosibirsk Oblast. The last stretch of its course is in the Pavlodar Region of Kazakhstan.

Course 
The sources of the Burla are in the Ob Plateau,  to the northeast of Dolganka, Krutikhinsky District, and only  from the banks of the Ob River. The river flows roughly southwestwards all along its course. As it descends into the Kulunda Plain its channel scatters, becoming almost interrupted in places. Further west along the steppe, the lower course of the Burla consists in channels between mostly shallow lakes. In years of adequate rainfall the river flows into the endorheic lake Bolshoy Azhbulat, but in dry years it ends in Lake Bolshoye Topolnoye, east of the Russia/Kazakhstan border.

There are numerous settlements near the river, such as Alexeyevka, Utyanka, Novoilyinka, Pioner Truda, Topolnoye, Ustyanka, Staropeschanoye, Novoalexeyevka, Novopeschanoye, Burla, Prityka, Mikhaylovka and Petrovka, among others.

Tributaries 
All the tributaries dry up in the summer, but the Chuman connects with the Karasuk river in high water years. There are numerous lakes in the Burla basin. The shallow areas of the river and neighboring wetlands freeze in the winter.

See also
List of rivers of Russia

References

External links

 Джурбай едет на озеро Большой Ажбулат

Rivers of Altai Krai
Rivers of Novosibirsk Oblast
Rivers of Kazakhstan
West Siberian Plain
Endorheic basins of Asia